The Seattle BigFoot were an American soccer team based in Seattle, Washington. They were founded in 1995 as the Everett BigFoot and played in the USISL Pro League with home matches at Everett Memorial Stadium. They merged with the Puget Sound Hammers of the USISL Premier League to become the Puget Sound BigFoot who played in the USISL PDSL during the 1997 season at West Seattle Stadium. The Hammers were previously based in the southern Puget Sound region and played home matches in 1995 at high school stadiums in Sumner, Tacoma, and on Vashon Island. They played in 1996 at Peninsula High School in Gig Harbor with a roster of players from local colleges.

The team moved to Seattle for their final season; in February 1999, owner Bill Hurme announced that the team would be renamed to the Seattle Sounders Select as part of an affiliation with the Seattle Sounders of the A-League, who had already used them as an unofficial development squad in the past.

Everett BigFoot Year-by-year

Puget Sound Hammers Year-by-year

Puget Sound/Seattle BigFoot Year-by-year

References

Defunct soccer clubs in Washington (state)
B
1995 establishments in Washington (state)
1998 disestablishments in Washington (state)
Soccer clubs in Washington (state)
Association football clubs disestablished in 1998
Association football clubs established in 1995